Kenny Williams or Ken Williams (April 12, 1914 – February 16, 1984), born Kenneth Williams Fertig Jr. in Edmonton, Alberta, Canada, was an announcer for American television from the late 1940s to 1980s. He was best known as the announcer of many game shows produced by Merrill Heatter and Bob Quigley (including Hollywood Squares, High Rollers, Gambit, and others). He also appeared on screen as "Kenny the Cop" on Video Village and Shenanigans. He did one show for Mark Goodson-Bill Todman Productions, Two for the Money, in 1952. As a radio actor in the 1940s to 1950s, he appeared on shows such as X Minus One, where he played Rhysling on the episode "The Green Hills of Earth". He was also one of the announcers for the Buck Rogers radio program, among others. He died at home in Los Angeles, California, on February 16, 1984.

References

American radio personalities
American television personalities
1914 births
1984 deaths
Game show announcers